Shanbi is a station on the Taoyuan Airport MRT located in Luzhu District, Taoyuan City, Taiwan. The station opened for commercial service on 2 March 2017.

This elevated station has two side platforms and two tracks. It opened for trial service on 2 February 2017, and for commercial service 2 March 2017.

History
 2017-03-02: The station opened for commercial service with the opening of the Taipei-Huanbei section of the Airport MRT.

Around the station
Shanjiao Elementary School
Shanjiao Junior High School
Shanjiao Night Market (600m northeast of the station)
Linkou Power Plant
Wu-jiou-tung Mountain Trail (2.4km southeast of the station)

Exits
Exit 1: Section 3, Nanshan Rd

See also
 Taoyuan Metro

References

2017 establishments in Taiwan
Railway stations opened in 2017
Taoyuan Airport MRT stations